The Aspley Bus Station, also known as Aspley Hypermarket Bus Station, at Aspley, Queensland, is served by Translink bus routes. It is part of the Aspley Hypermarket Shopping Centre. It is in Zone 2 of the Translink integrated public transport system.

The station has been upgraded with enhanced waiting areas, an enclosed lounge, improved accessibility and real-time passenger information, as part of Translink's wider project for upgrading bus stations in South East Queensland.

An additional service has been added in 2008 which offers Personalised Public Transport (PPT). This service consists of a 'Black & White' MaxiTaxi servicing from the bus station, up Albany Creek Road, up Bangalow Street, down through Trouts Road, then back to the Hypermarket. This service runs approximately every 20 minutes during peak times morning and afternoon. The cost of this service is $1 and will pick up patrons anywhere along the route.

All bus routes to and from the station are operated by Transport for Brisbane.

Facilities 
The interchange is made up of four bus stops. The interchange is a side platform, located beside the Aspley Hypermarket. Located at the interchange is toilets, vending machines, seats, bike rack and an air-conditioned waiting room.

Bus routes 
The following bus routes services Toombul bus interchange:

References 

Bus stations in Brisbane